Alexis Guimond (11 June 1999) is an American-born Canadian male Paralympic alpine skier.

Career
He made his first Paralympic appearance during the 2018 Winter Paralympics and competed in alpine skiing events. He claimed his first Paralympic medal, a bronze medal, in the men's giant slalom standing event at the  2018 Winter Paralympics.

He won the bronze medal in the men's Super-G standing event at the 2022 Winter Paralympics.

References

External links 
 
 

1999 births
Living people
Canadian male alpine skiers
Alpine skiers at the 2018 Winter Paralympics
Paralympic alpine skiers of Canada
Paralympic bronze medalists for Canada
Medalists at the 2018 Winter Paralympics
Alpine skiers at the 2022 Winter Paralympics
Medalists at the 2022 Winter Paralympics
People from Houston
Canadian people of American descent
Paralympic medalists in alpine skiing